Mário Luís Frias (born 9 October 1971) is a Brazilian actor, and was a Special Secretary of Culture, a cabinet position in president Jair Bolsonaro's federal administration from 2020 to 2022.

Career

Special Secretary of Culture
Frias took office on June 23, 2020. He is the fifth in the position since Bolsonaro's dissolution of the Ministry of Culture in 2019, and took office over a month after the previous secretary, Regina Duarte, was removed.

Several artists, both supporters and critics of Bolsonaro's government, condemned the choice of Frias for Special Secretary of Culture. They argued that Frias is unfit for the job, that the government's office nominations were a 'joke', and compared him to former Education Minister Abraham Weintraub, who was involved in many controversies and faced heavy criticism for his actions during his time in office. Similarly to Weintraub, Frias was mocked for making grammar mistakes on tweets he posted after taking office.

Despite being a vocal opponent of the perks of public office, in early 2022 Mário Frias spent over 10,000 dollars of public funds in a trip to the United States in order to visit MMA fighter Renzo Gracie and attend the release ceremony of his biography, written by Brazilian neonazi and former Special Secretary of Culture Roberto Alvim.

Frias joined the PL on March 12, 2022, 
announcing his pre-candidacy for federal deputy for the state of São Paulo. On March 31 of the same year, he was removed from the position of Special Secretary for Culture.

Filmography

References

Bibliography

External links
 
 
 

1971 births
Living people
Brazilian male telenovela actors
Liberal Party (Brazil, 2006) politicians